Highway 936 is a provincial highway in the Canadian province of Saskatchewan. It runs from Highway 2 to a dead end.

See also 
Roads in Saskatchewan
Transportation in Saskatchewan

References 

936